During the 1992–93 English football season, Derby County F.C. competed in the Football League First Division.

Season summary
Despite the addition of Craig Short for £2.5m from Notts County –  a record for a team outside of the top flight and for a defender at any level – the club could only an 8th-placed finish in the 1992–93 Division One table, largely as a result of taking three points from their opening 7 fixtures, missing out on the playoffs altogether. Whilst the club did manage a trip to Wembley for the first time in nearly 20 years – reaching the final of the Anglo-Italian Cup, where they lost 1–3 to Cremonese – and recorded a club record 7 consecutive away league wins, starting with a 3–1 win at Cambridge United on 3 October 1992 and ending with a 2–1 defeat at Brentford on Boxing Day, 1992, the season was seen as something of a disappointment considering the amount of money spent and the players available to the club.

The Anglo Italian cup run, coupled with extended interest in the Coca-Cola Cup (where they took Arsenal to a third round replay) and reaching the FA Cup Quarter-finals for the first time in 9 years, taking Sheffield Wednesday to a replay after a 3–3 draw at The Baseball Ground. meant the cup took part in 64 matches between 15 August 1992 and 8 May 1993, a new club record with Paul Kitson taking part in 61 of them and finishing the season as leading scorer, with 24 goals in all competitions.

Final league table

 Pld = Matches ; W = Matches won; D = Matches drawn; L = Matches lost; F = Goals for; A = Goals against; GD = Goal difference; Pts = Points

NB In the Football League goals scored (F) takes precedence over goal difference

Results
Derby County's score comes first

Legend

Football League First Division

FA Cup

League Cup

Anglo-Italian Cup

Players

First-team squad
The following players all played for the first-team this season.

Reserve team
The following players did not appear for the first team this season.

References

Notes

Derby County F.C. seasons
Derby County